The Malheur National Forest is a National Forest in the U.S. state of Oregon. The forest consists of high desert grasslands, sage, juniper, pine, fir, and other tree species. The Strawberry Mountains extend east to west through the center of the forest. U.S. Route 395 runs south to north through the forest, while U.S. Route 26 runs east to west.

Overview

The forest was established by President Theodore Roosevelt on June 13, 1908, and is named after the Malheur River, from the French, meaning "misfortune". It is managed by the United States Forest Service for timber extraction, cattle grazing, gold mining and wilderness use.

In descending order of land area, the forest is located in parts of Grant, Harney, Baker, and Malheur counties. There are three ranger districts in the forest, with offices in John Day, Prairie City, and Hines.

The Malheur National Forest contains the largest known organism (by area) in the world: an Armillaria ostoyae (fungus) that spans  and is located high on a ridgeline immediately west of Clear Creek.

Wilderness
There are two wilderness areas in the Malheur National Forest.

Strawberry Mountain Wilderness at 

See also
Vinegar Hill-Indian Rock Scenic Area, a high-elevation scenic area in the northeast portion of the forest
Malheur National Wildlife Refuge, a federally protected refuge to the south of the forest

References

External links

Malheur National Forest home page
Cedar Grove Botanical Area

 
National Forests of Oregon
Protected areas of Grant County, Oregon
Protected areas of Harney County, Oregon
Protected areas of Baker County, Oregon
Protected areas of Malheur County, Oregon
1908 establishments in Oregon
Protected areas established in 1908